is a Japanese composer and arranger, known for his work on many television dramas, anime series, and movies. He is currently represented by ONE MUSIC, a music production company.

Biography
Suehiro was born in Saitama. When he was a teenager, he started a band and played as a guitarist, keyboardist, and drummer. He cited Ennio Morricone and Joe Hisaishi as inspiration for him to pursue a composer career.

He studied composition and arrangement under Taro Iwashiro and Akinori Ōsawa. Formerly employed by POPHOLIC, where he worked on anime series, he is now represented by ONE MUSIC and works mainly on television dramas.

Works

Anime

Films

Television series

Video games

Other involvements

References

External links
 
 
 Discography at VGMdb

1980 births
Anime composers
Japanese film score composers
Japanese male composers
Japanese male film score composers
Japanese male musicians
Japanese music arrangers
Japanese television composers
Living people
Male television composers
Musicians from Saitama Prefecture